The 1990 All-Ireland Minor Hurling Championship was the 60th staging of the All-Ireland Minor Hurling Championship since its establishment by the Gaelic Athletic Association in 1928. The championship began on 12 May 1990 and ended on 3 September 1990.

Offaly entered the championship as the defending champions, however, they were beaten by Wexford in the Leinster quarter-final.

On 3 September 1990, Kilkenny won the championship following a 1–09 to 0–09 defeat of Cork in the All-Ireland final. This was their 14th All-Ireland title overall and their first title since 1988.

Cork's Damien Fleming was the championship's top scorer with 7-27.

Results

Leinster Minor Hurling Championship

Semi-finals

Final

Munster Minor Hurling Championship

First round

Semi-finals

Final

Ulster Minor Hurling Championship

Semi-final

Final

All-Ireland Minor Hurling Championship

Semi-finals

Final

Championship statistics

Top scorers

Top scorers overall

References

External links
 All-Ireland Minor Hurling Championship: Roll Of Honour

Minor
All-Ireland Minor Hurling Championship